The Buck Hill Covered Bridge, Eichelberger's Covered Bridge, or Abram Hess' Mill Bridge is a burr arch-truss style covered bridge located in Lancaster County, Pennsylvania, United States.  It is located on the Buck Hill Farm's pond on private property.

The bridge's WGCB Number is 38-36-15.  In 1980 it was added to the National Register of Historic Places as structure number 80003528.  It is located on private property.

The bridge is one of only 3 covered bridges in the county with horizontal side boards.

History 
The original build date and builder of the covered bridge is unknown. However, it was probably built around 1825 to provide access to Abram Hess's store. In 1844 the bridge was sold to George Eichelberger. That same year the bridge was heavily damaged in a flood and had to be repaired. It was rebuilt by Theodore D. Cochran at a cost of $799.

The bridge spanned Middle Creek.

See also
 List of bridges on the National Register of Historic Places in Pennsylvania
 List of covered bridges in Lancaster County, Pennsylvania
 National Register of Historic Places listings in Lancaster County, Pennsylvania

References 

Bridges completed in 1825
Covered bridges on the National Register of Historic Places in Pennsylvania
Covered bridges in Lancaster County, Pennsylvania
Pedestrian bridges in Pennsylvania
Former road bridges in the United States
National Register of Historic Places in Lancaster County, Pennsylvania
Road bridges on the National Register of Historic Places in Pennsylvania
Wooden bridges in Pennsylvania
Burr Truss bridges in the United States